Casa Tua Camden is one of two Italian restaurants in London opened by Giuseppe Miggiano, native from Italy, Salento, Nociglia, (born 25 May 1985) and moved in London in 2009.

History  
Together with John O'Hanlon, Giuseppe first opened the Casa Tua doors on 8 August 2013 in Camden. After meeting in 2009 at a restaurant in Soho Bar Italia, they formed a great friendship that led to John helping to make Giuseppe’s dream of running his own restaurant a reality.

The words ‘Casa Tua’ translate to ‘Your Home’ in English. The concept of a restaurant is to create an experience of home dining in Southern Italy. The food is based on old Italian recipes from Puglia and Mediterranean influences.

The success of Casa Tua Camden led to the opening of a second restaurant, Casa Tua Kings Cross in 2015.

Recognition 
Casa Tua Camden is a winner of Time Out Love London Awards 2014. In 2015 Casa Tua Camden has been awarded the prestigious Good Food Award.

References

External links 
 Official site of Casa Tua restaurants 
 Camden Review 
 Kentishtowner

Italian restaurants in London